Mammillaria glassii is a species of cactus in the subfamily Cactoideae. It is a small, clumping cactus with "fluffy white spines." M. glassii is native to Mexico in the states of Coahuila and Nuevo León.

References

Plants described in 1968
glassii